Gangster World (alternatively titled The Outsider for its video release) is a science-fiction TV movie released in 1998.  It was about a futuristic theme park in which people interact with androids in violent (and sometimes sexual) gangster-style scenarios. Despite the title and premise, it is unconnected with the film Westworld.

In 1998, a DVD was released of the film.

Cast

 Xavier Declie as The Outsider
 Gabriel Dell Jr. as Garland Widmark
 Bridget Flanery as Lita Hayworth
 Stacey Williams as Astor
 David Leisure as Dr. Greenstreet
 Lindsey Ginter as Alan Houston 
 Julia Dahl as Claire Arden
 Jerry Doyle as Rains
 Willy Leong as Lorre 
 Randy Kovitz as Mason
 Bob Koherr as Rath
 Glenn Takakjian as Bone
 Jerry Spicer as Ladd
 Gail Thackray as Wubba Wubba Girl
 Michael Edwards as Frat Boy #1
 Paul Dallas as Frat Boy #2
 Jodie Fisher as Housewife

References

External links
 

1998 television films
1998 films
1990s science fiction films
Films set in amusement parks
Android (robot) films